Hiram C. Bull (August 19, 1820 – October 12, 1879) was an American businessman, politician, and military officer.

Born in Laona, Chautauqua County, New York, he went to school in Fredonia, New York. Bull studied in law in Fredonia, New York and was admitted to the New York bar in 1843. He move to Johnstown, Pennsylvania and continued to practiced law. He moved to Milwaukee, Wisconsin and practiced law. He lived briefly in California. Bull then opened lumberyards in Milwaukee Janesville, and Madison, Wisconsin. Bull served in the second Wisconsin Constitutional Convention of 1847–1848. He then served in the Wisconsin State Senate, from Madison, Wisconsin, in 1857 and 1858 and was a Republican. He served as adjutant-general of Wisconsin. Bull also was involved with the Wisconsin Historical Society. In 1859, he moved to St. Louis, Missouri and then to Arizona Territory and New Mexico Territory. He served in the 9th Iowa Volunteer Infantry Regiment during the American Civil War. After the civil war, Bull opened a lumberyard in Leavenworth, Kansas. In 1870, he helped found a town Bull City, Kansas in Osborne County, Kansas. In 1872, Bull served as probate judge for Osborne County. From 1877 until his death in 1879, Bull served in the Kansas House of Representatives and was a Republican. On October 12, 1879, Bull was gored to death by an elk at his home in Bull City.

References

External links
 

1820 births
1879 deaths
People from Pomfret, New York
Politicians from Madison, Wisconsin
Politicians from Milwaukee
People from Osborne County, Kansas
New York (state) lawyers
Pennsylvania lawyers
Kansas lawyers
Wisconsin lawyers
Businesspeople from Kansas
Businesspeople from Madison, Wisconsin
Military personnel from Madison, Wisconsin
People of Iowa in the American Civil War
Kansas state court judges
Republican Party members of the Kansas House of Representatives
Republican Party Wisconsin state senators
Accidental deaths in Kansas
American city founders
Lawyers from Madison, Wisconsin
19th-century American politicians
19th-century American businesspeople
19th-century American judges
19th-century American lawyers